My Backyard Was a Mountain is a 2005 multiple award winning AFI short film by Puerto Rican - American writer/director Adam Schlachter and produced by Austin Wakefield.

Schlachter first filmed a black-and-white version of the movie in 2004 called Palmarejo to secure financing for his project.  He was the recipient of multiple grants, including The Caucus Foundation's Gold Circle Award
and Hispanic Scholarship Fund's HSF / McNamara Family Creative Arts Project Grant. It has won many awards, including Best short or student film at the 2006 Imagen Awards. Much of the cast of the earlier version was invited to reprise their roles for My Backyard Was a Mountain.  The movie premiered on October 23, 2005 at the Arclight Hollywood Film Festival and is currently available for download on iTunes.

Plot

The movie is set in the early 1960s and deals with Adan's family needing to relocate from rural Puerto Rico to New York City.  Since he cannot take it with him, he has to find a new home for his pet goat in a hurry.  The movie also deals with Adan's saying good-bye to his first love, Denise.

Cast

References

External links 

2000s Spanish-language films
2005 short films
2005 films
Films set in the 1960s